69 Virginis is a single star in the zodiac constellation of Virgo, located about 259 light years away. It is visible to the naked eye as a faint orange-hued star with an apparent visual magnitude of 4.76, although it is a suspected variable that may range in magnitude from 4.75 down to 4.79. This object is moving closer to the Earth with a heliocentric radial velocity of −13 km/s. The light from this star is polarized due to intervening interstellar dust.

It is a red clump giant, which indicates is on the horizontal branch generating energy via helium fusion at its core. The star is about 288 million years old with 3.5 times the mass of the Sun and 15 times the Sun's radius. It is radiating 87 times the Sun's luminosity from its enlarged photosphere at an effective temperature of 4,909 K.

References 

K-type giants
CN stars
Horizontal-branch stars
Suspected variables
Virgo (constellation)
Durchmusterung objects
Virginis, 069
Gliese and GJ objects
116976
065639
5068